Woody Deck (born June 8, 1983 in Nashville, TN) is an American professional poker player residing in Vilnius, Lithuania.

A former student at the University of Nevada, Las Vegas, Deck pledged Alpha Epsilon Pi, the Jewish Fraternity, where he has been seen ironing $100 bills in his dorm room. Deck has also played poker in casinos since the age of 17. Discovered in the Bellagio's top section as being underage, he was thrown out and shortly thereafter left Las Vegas for Europe where he could play legally. In Europe he quickly became one of the top tournament and cash game players, winning five tournaments in the span of 12 months.

A cash game specialist who seldom enters tournaments, Deck holds the best record in Pot Limit Omaha Hi/Lo tournaments with a current streak of 3 consecutive final tables (1 win), and owns the record for consecutive heads-up tournaments matches won, 13.

During his streak of heads-up matches, he won back to back heads-up titles at the 2005 Barcelona Heads-up Poker Circuit (HPC), and the 2005 Slovenia HPC before losing in the 3rd round of the 2006 World Heads-Up Poker Championship.

By way of his European ranking, Deck qualified for the Professional Poker Tour (PPT) for the 2006-2007 season.

As of 2008, his total live tournament winnings exceed $330,000.

Notes

External links
 Pokerpages Profile

1983 births
American poker players
Living people